Białobrzegi is a town in Masovian Voivodeship, east-central Poland.
 
Białobrzegi may also refer to the following places: 
Białobrzegi, part of the town of Tomaszów Mazowiecki
Białobrzegi, Lubartów County in Lublin Voivodeship (east Poland)
Białobrzegi, Podlaskie Voivodeship (north-east Poland)
Białobrzegi, Zamość County in Lublin Voivodeship (east Poland)
Białobrzegi, Subcarpathian Voivodeship (south-east Poland)
Białobrzegi, Legionowo County in Masovian Voivodeship (east-central Poland)
Białobrzegi, Lipsko County in Masovian Voivodeship (east-central Poland)
Białobrzegi, Płock County in Masovian Voivodeship (east-central Poland)
Białobrzegi, Sokołów County in Masovian Voivodeship (east-central Poland)